Old Rock House is a historic garrison house in Thomson, Georgia.

The fortified stone house was built about 1785 by Thomas Ansley. The house was purportedly the home to ancestors of former president Jimmy Carter. The building was added to the National Register of Historic Places in 1970.

The house was owned by the Wrightsborough Quaker Community Foundation, Inc., in 1970.  It is owned by McDuffie County.  It is the oldest well-documented house in Georgia, although there may be older ones.

See also
List of the oldest buildings in Georgia

References

External links
 Atlas Obsucra article

Houses on the National Register of Historic Places in Georgia (U.S. state)
Houses completed in 1784
McDuffie County, Georgia
National Register of Historic Places in McDuffie County, Georgia